On Our Backs was the first women-run erotica magazine and the first magazine to feature lesbian erotica for a lesbian audience in the United States. It ran from 1984 to 2006.

Origin
The magazine was first published in 1984 by Debi Sundahl and Myrna Elana, with the contributions of Susie Bright, Nan Kinney, Leon Mostovoy, Honey Lee Cottrell, Dawn Lewis, Shelby Sharie Cohen, Happy Hyder, Tee Corinne, Jewelle Gomez, Judith Stein, Joan Nestle, Patrick Califia, Morgan Gwenwald, Katie Niles, Noreen Scully, Sarita Johnson, and many others. Susie Bright became editor-in-chief for the next six years. Later editors included Diane Anderson-Minshall, Shar Rednour, Tristan Taormino, and Diana Cage. On Our Backs defined the look and politics of lesbian culture for the 80s, as well as playing a definitive role in the feminist sex wars of the period, taking the side of sex-positive feminism.

The title of the magazine was a satirical reference to off our backs, a long-running feminist newspaper that published the work of many anti-pornography feminists during the 1980s, and which the founders of On Our Backs considered prudish about sexuality. off our backs regarded the new magazine as "pseudo-feminist" and threatened legal action over the logo OOB.

Operations
In 1985, Sundahl and Kinney spun off the first in a series of precedent-making lesbian erotic videos, called Fatale Video.  Distribution of the magazine in Australia began in 1986.  By the late 1980s, Fatale Media was the largest producer of lesbian pornography in the world.

In 1994, the magazine experienced financial problems, and filed for bankruptcy in May 1996.  After being bought out by a new publisher, Melissa Murphy (who released only one issue) , it was acquired by HAF Enterprises (publisher of Girlfriends). The original creators moved on to other projects .

Publishing
In 1996, a photography book based on the pioneering work of On Our Back'''s artists called Nothing but the Girl was published by Cassell Press, edited by Susie Bright and Jill Posener .

End of publication and availability online
H.A.F.'s publication of On Our Backs and its sister publication, Girlfriends, both ceased publication in March 2006 after being bought out by the publishers of Velvetpark Magazine. Reveal Digital, a digital publisher, digitized issues of On Our Backs from July 1984 to December 2004; however, due to concerns regarding access by minors and contributor privacy, the scans were removed (at least temporarily) from Reveal Digital's Independent Voices collection.

See also
 Feminist pornography
 Lesbian feminism
 Lesbian literature
 List of lesbian periodicals

References

Further reading
  Preview.
  Preview.
 "Sex Wars Revisited": Laura Guy on the role of On Our Backs in the feminist sex wars for Aperture External links 
 Digitized archive of On Our Backs'' at Reveal Digital (starting with issue 1, Summer 1984)

1980s LGBT literature
1990s LGBT literature
2000s LGBT literature
Bimonthly magazines published in the United States
Defunct women's magazines published in the United States
Erotica magazines published in the United States
Lesbian culture in California
Lesbian erotica
Lesbian pornographic magazines
Lesbian-related mass media in the United States
Magazines established in 1984
Magazines disestablished in 2006
Magazines published in San Francisco
Pornographic magazines published in the United States
LGBT literature in the United States